The Blues Band is a British blues band formed in 1979 by Paul Jones, former lead vocalist and harmonica player with Manfred Mann, and guitarist Tom McGuinness also of Manfred Mann and The Roosters. The band’s first line-up also included bassist Gary Fletcher, slide-guitarist Dave Kelly who had previously played with The John Dummer Band, Howling Wolf and John Lee Hooker and drummer Hughie Flint, of John Mayall's Blues Breakers and McGuinness Flint, the band he formed with Tom McGuinness.  In 1982 Flint left and was replaced by former Family drummer Rob Townsend.

History
Their first album The Official Blues Band Bootleg Album, a mixture of blues standards and original songs featured the Jones and McGuinness composition "Come On In" and their long-standing stage favourite "Flatfoot Sam". This album initially attracted no interest from major record companies, so the band pressed a limited run of 3,000, hand-stamped their logo on the cardboard sleeve and signed them all.  After unqualified endorsement from BBC Radio 1 presenter Simon Bates and others, media interest resulted in a recording contract with Arista Records, who re-released the album under the same title. After that they released Ready, Itchy Feet and Brand Loyalty albums and regularly toured through Europe.

They briefly disbanded after recording a live album Bye Bye Blues (1983), but reformed three years later.  In 1995, they unveiled their version of the 'Unplugged' craze, but rather than a MTV event, Wire Less was recorded at the Snape Maltings in Aldeburgh, Suffolk. They later recorded albums such as Stepping Out (2002) and Thank You Brother Ray (2004), which paid tribute to Ray Charles. 

In 2022, the Blues Band marked their final live performances with the release of their last studio album "So Long".

Discography

Albums
 The Official Blues Band Bootleg Album (1980). Number 40 UK
 Ready (1980). Number 36 UK
 Itchy Feet (1981). Number 60 UK
 Brand Loyalty (1982)
 Bye-Bye Blues (1983)
 These Kind of Blues (1986)
 Back for More (1989)
 Fat City (1991)
 Homage (1993)
 Wire Less (1995)
 Live at the BBC (1996)
 18 Years Old and Alive (1996)
 The Best of The Blues Band (1999) US only
 Brassed Up (1999)
 Scratching on my Screen (2001)
 Green Stuff (2001)
 Stepping Out (2002)
 Be My Guest (2003) (Best of guest appearances)
 Thank You Brother Ray (2005)
 Few Short Lines (2011)
 The Rooster Crowed (2018)
 Bye Bye Blues Band (2021)
 So Long (2022)

Compilation albums
Live At Kent Custom Bike Show (1988) Cassette only

Chart EP
 "Maggie's Farm"/"Ain't It Tuff"/"Diddy Wah Diddy"/"Back Door Man" (1980) Number 68 - UK

Singles
 "Come On In" / "The Blues Band Song" (1980)
 "Find Yourself Another Fool" / "SUS Blues" (1980)
 "Nadine" / "That's All Right" (1980) (Two live tracks issued free with early copies of Ready)
 "Who's Right, Who's Wrong?" / "Itchy Feet" (1981)
 "Come On" / "Green Stuff" (1981)
 "Take Me Home" / "So Bad" (1982)
 "Hey Hey Little Girl" / "SUS Blues" (1982) (Limited edition live single)
 "Seemed Like a Good Idea" / "Rolling Log" (1982)
 "Blue Collar" / "Duisburg Blues" (1989) (Promo for Back for More)

DVDs
 Across Borders - Live (2004)
 The Blues Band in Concert : Steppin' Out On Main (2004)
 The Blues Band:Bungay Jumpin' Live (2009)
 The Blues Band:Official Blues Band Bootleg DVD-DeLIVEred (2009)
 Rock Goes To College: The Blues Band, 22 May 1980, Keele University  (2015) (DVD/CD)

References

External links
The Blues Band official website

English blues rock musical groups
Musical groups established in 1979
English blues musical groups